The Gridiron Club, popularly called The Grid, is a club open to male and female students at the University of Oxford. The name of any prospective member is entered into 'The Book'. Current members may subsequently sign in approval of the proposed. If any current member disapproves of the proposed, they are given the opportunity to 'black ball' with proper justification. Members of other clubs, such as The Bullingdon Club, The Piers Gaveston and The Stoics, are usually chosen from among existing Grid members.

The club was founded in 1884 and, as with other beefsteak clubs of the 18th and 19th centuries, the traditional grilling gridiron is the club's symbol. The gridiron symbol appears on the club tie (white gridirons on an Oxford blue field) and on the sign outside its current premises in The Golden Cross.  References have been made to the Gridiron Club in many works, including Evelyn Waugh's Brideshead Revisited, Compton MacKenzie's Sinister Street and Ferdinand Mount's Cold Cream: My Early Life and Other Mistakes.

The Gridiron's reciprocal club at the University of Cambridge is the Pitt Club. Comparable societies in the United States include Skull and Bones at Yale, Sphinx Society at Dartmouth, Cap and Skull at Rutgers, Trinity College's Episkopon in Canada, and the Porcellian Club at Harvard University in Boston.

Notable former members of the club include John le Carré, Alexander, 7th Marquess of Bath, Lord Michael Pratt (a former Secretary of the Grid), and Prime Minister David Cameron (President of the Grid 1987–1988).

The Gridiron has a board of trustees, the members of which are usually former members of the club. In addition, there is at least one Senior Member who supervises the running of the club and is invariably a don at the University of Oxford. Day-to-day management is handled by an undergraduate committee consisting of a President, Treasurer, Secretary and a small number of other members 'without portfolio'. During the undergraduate years of Boris Johnson, David Cameron and George Osborne, the Senior Members of the Grid were the distinguished historians Jeremy Catto of Oriel College and Maurice Keen of Balliol. 
Sports journalist Sally Jones (journalist) and Lord Salisbury's daughter Lady Georgiana Campbell both gained notoriety by separately standing for election to the then all-male club (Lady Georgiana famously doing so in male clothing).

See also
 List of University of Oxford dining clubs

References

Clubs and societies of the University of Oxford
1884 establishments in England